Li Weiwei (born July 7, 1982, in Kunming, Yunnan) is a female Chinese handball player. She competed at the 2004 Summer Olympics and 2008 Summer Olympics.

In 2004, Li Weiwei finished eighth with the Chinese team in the women's competition. She played in all seven matches and scored 32 goals.

References

External links
Yahoo profile

1982 births
Living people
Chinese female handball players
Handball players at the 2004 Summer Olympics
Handball players at the 2008 Summer Olympics
Olympic handball players of China
Sportspeople from Kunming
Asian Games medalists in handball
Handball players at the 2002 Asian Games
Handball players at the 2006 Asian Games
Handball players at the 2010 Asian Games
Asian Games gold medalists for China
Asian Games bronze medalists for China
Medalists at the 2002 Asian Games
Medalists at the 2010 Asian Games